Triyaningsih (born 15 May 1987) is an Indonesian long-distance runner. She competed in the marathon at the 2012 Summer Olympics, placing 84th with a time of 2:41:15.

Competition record

References

External links
 Personal website of Triyaningsih

1987 births
Living people
People from Semarang
Indonesian female long-distance runners
Indonesian female marathon runners
Olympic athletes of Indonesia
Athletes (track and field) at the 2012 Summer Olympics
Asian Games competitors for Indonesia
Athletes (track and field) at the 2010 Asian Games
Sportspeople from Central Java
Southeast Asian Games medalists in athletics
Southeast Asian Games gold medalists for Indonesia
Southeast Asian Games silver medalists for Indonesia
Southeast Asian Games bronze medalists for Indonesia
Competitors at the 2007 Southeast Asian Games
Competitors at the 2009 Southeast Asian Games
Competitors at the 2011 Southeast Asian Games
Competitors at the 2013 Southeast Asian Games
Competitors at the 2015 Southeast Asian Games
Competitors at the 2017 Southeast Asian Games
Competitors at the 2011 Summer Universiade